Kundadri  is a  hill (826 mt) with dense forests in the Western Ghats located in Shimoga District Karnataka State, India.It is 70 km from Udupi city. This hill is known for 17th century Jain temple dedicated to Parshwanath  tirthankara and the place is known to have given shelter to Acharya Kundakunda during earlier centuries. The main deity of this temple is Parshwanatha, 23rd tirthankar. Two small ponds formed by the rock on one side of this temple provided water to earlier sages. Government of Karnataka joined hands with a philanthropist from Mumbai to construct an all-weather road to the top of the hill.

History
More than two thousand years ago, the greatest Digambar Jain muni named Kundakunda Acharya stayed here and prompted the birth of this jain holy place. A temple is constructed with stone statues of jain sages. As the place is secluded, there has been efforts to damage stone statues to find hidden treasure.

Transportation

Kundadri is at a distance of about 80 km. from the district headquarters, Shimoga and about 20 km from Thirthahalli town. From Shimoga, one has to take the National Highway NH-13 (Thirthahalli road) to reach Thirthahalli. Then take State Highway SH-1 (Agumbe Road) up to Guddekeri and then take left deviation. The total distance from Bangalore to Thirthahalli is  332 km. From Mangalore, one can take NH-13 to reach Thirthahalli.  The distance from Mangalore to Thirthahalli is around 146 km. There are numerous mini-buses from Udupi to Thirthahalli.  From Udupi railway station 86 km to Thirthahalli. The nearest railway station is in Shimoga. The nearest airport is Mangalore International Airport.

See also

Jainism in Karnataka

References

Mountains of Karnataka
Jain temples in Karnataka
17th-century Jain temples
Buildings and structures in Shimoga district
Geography of Shimoga district